The 2016 Three Days of De Panne (Dutch: Driedaagse De Panne–Koksijde) was the 40th edition of the Three Days of De Panne cycling stage race. The race included four stages, two of which took place on the final day. It was rated as a 2.HC event in the 2016 UCI Europe Tour.

Stages

The race includes four stages. The first three of these are road stages, while the fourth is an individual time trial.

Teams
22 teams took part in the 2016 Three Days of De Panne. 11 of these were UCI WorldTeams and the remaining 11 were UCI Professional Continental teams.
Wanty–Groupe Gobert withdrew before the start of the race on Monday 28 March after the death of Antoine Demoitié in Gent–Wevelgem a day earlier.

Stages

Stage 1

29 March 2016, De Panne to Zottegem,

Stage 2

30 March 2016, Zottegem to Koksijde,

Stage 3a

31 March 2016, De Panne to De Panne,

Stage 3b

31 March 2016, De Panne to De Panne,  (ITT)

Classification leadership table

References

External links
 

Three Days of Bruges–De Panne
Three Days of De Panne
Three Days of De Panne